Rhinacloa forticornis, the western plant bug, is a species of plant bug in the family Miridae. It is found in the Caribbean Sea, Central America, North America, Oceania, and South America.

References

Further reading

External links

 

Phylinae
Articles created by Qbugbot
Insects described in 1876